Gun laws in Virginia regulate the sale, possession, and use of firearms and ammunition in the Commonwealth of Virginia in the United States.

Summary table

History
Historians trace Virginia's first experience with gun control laws back to the First General Assembly of Jamestown on July 30, 1619. During this-five day meeting, Virginia officials voted in a gun control enactment that regulated the sale of firearms to Native Americans. In fact, each period of American history brought with it its own series of gun control regulations in Virginia. More recently, in the fallout of the Virginia Beach mass shooting in the summer of 2019, Governor Northam's Democrat controlled General Assembly have attempted to pass substantial new gun control legislation. In February 2020, a proposed assault weapons ban failed in the Virginia Senate.  In April 2020, several new gun laws were enacted, including a requirement of background checks for private sales, a red flag law enabling Extreme Risk Protection Orders, a requirement to report lost or stolen guns, and the reinstating of a one-handgun-a-month law.

Overview
The Constitution of Virginia protects the right of the people to keep and bear arms from government infringement. The Commonwealth of Virginia preempts local regulation of several aspects of firearms, though some local regulation is explicitly permitted. Virginia passed the Uniform Machine Gun Act, which was drafted by the National Conference of Commissioners on Uniform State Laws. The only firearms in Virginia that are prohibited are the Armsel Striker, also known as the Striker 12, similar shotguns, and any "plastic firearms."  Firearms must contain at least 3.7 ounces of electromagnetically detectable metal in the barrel, slide, cylinder, frame or receiver, and when subjected to x-ray machines, generate an image that accurately depicts their shape.  For example, Glock pistols which have polymer frames and metal slides and barrels are legal. There are no magazine capacity limitations, except that a concealed handgun permit (CHP) is required in order to carry magazines with more than 20 rounds in some urban, public areas.

Prohibited places include courthouses, air carrier terminals, schools, child day centers, the Capitol and General Assembly buildings (as of early 2020), and churches, though some exceptions apply, including a 2011 Attorney General opinion that personal protection constitutes good and sufficient reason to carry at a church. George Mason University, James Madison University, Virginia Commonwealth University, and Virginia Polytechnic University (Virginia Tech) currently possess rules that prohibit firearms on school property.

A 2006 opinion issued by State Attorney General Robert F. McDonnell stated "... the governing boards of Virginia's public colleges and universities may not impose a general prohibition on the carrying of concealed weapons by permitted individuals ... Pursuant to specific grants of statutory authority, however, it is my opinion that colleges and universities may regulate the conduct of students and employees to prohibit them from carrying concealed weapons on campus."

In 2011, the Virginia Supreme Court found that the language used by George Mason University (GMU) to "... not impose a total ban of weapons on campus. Rather, the regulation is tailored, restricting weapons only in those places where people congregate and are most vulnerable – inside campus buildings and at campus events. Individuals may still carry or possess weapons on the open grounds of GMU, and in other places on campus not enumerated in the regulation."

There are age restrictions on the possession of firearms and some people are prohibited from possessing firearms due to certain criminal convictions. Licensed dealers must have the Virginia State Police conduct a background check prior to completing the sale of certain firearms. Persons who are not in the business of selling firearms, but make occasional, private sales, are not required to perform a background check before selling their firearms. Before July 1, 2012, a person could not purchase more than one handgun per 30-day period, though some exceptions applied; most significantly, holders of valid Concealed Handgun Permits (CHP) from Virginia were exempt from this restriction. The bill that repealed the "one-handgun-a-month law" was signed into law by Governor Bob McDonnell on February 28 of that year.

Open carry of a handgun without a permit is legal in Virginia at age 18, withstanding other applicable laws. Concealed carry of a handgun is allowed for persons who hold a valid CHP (concealed handgun permit), comply with certain restrictions, or who hold certain positions. Virginia shall issue a CHP to applicants 21 years of age or older, provided that they meet certain safety training requirements and do not have any disqualifying conditions under Title § 18.2-308.09 of the Virginia Code. Consuming an alcoholic beverage in ABC on-premises licensed restaurants and clubs, while carrying a concealed handgun, is prohibited; nor may any person carry a concealed handgun in a public place while under the influence of alcohol or illegal drugs (exceptions made for federal, state and local law enforcement). Any person permitted to carry a concealed firearm may not carry one in such manner in a public place while intoxicated. Possession of a firearm can compound the penalty for various other offenses, including illegal drug possession. Open carry while intoxicated is not addressed in the law and can presumed to be legal unless otherwise specified.

There are some restrictions on the use of weapons.  Brandishing a firearm is punishable by up to a year in jail.

Some localities have adopted Second Amendment sanctuary resolutions.

In March 2020, the Virginia State Legislature passed 7 gun control bills. The bills included the following provisions:
 Criminal background checks are now required for all gun sales, excluding sales between family members and under certain other circumstances. Private party transfers between individuals who do not have a pre-existing relationship now require a background check conducted at a gun store.
 Handgun purchases are now capped at 1 every 30 days. However, people with licenses to carry concealed pistols are excluded from this limit.
 Virginia now has a red flag law. Judges can temporarily order the seizure of firearms from persons who are deemed a threat to themselves or others.
 Local governments have expanded power to ban firearms in certain sensitive areas, such as government buildings and public events.
 The penalty for allowing a child under 14 years of age to possess a firearms by leaving it unsecured in a reckless fashion was increased from a Class 3 misdemeanor to a Class 1 misdemeanor.
 People subject to "permanent protective orders" (domestic violence restraining orders with a maximum duration of 2 years) are required to surrender their firearms to local law enforcement, sell them to a licensed dealer, or give them to a person who is not prohibited from possessing firearms within 24 hours of being served notice of the protective order.
 Gun owners must report lost or stolen firearms to police within 48 hours.
An assault weapons ban that was pushed by Virginia Governor Northam did not pass after significant protest by gun-rights advocates.

Concealed carry reciprocity
VA code 18.2-308.014 (reciprocity) states:

See also
 Law of Virginia

External links
 "Crimes Involving Health and Safety". Legislative Information System. Virginia General Assembly.
 "Virginia Gun Laws Summary". National Rifle Association  Institute for Legislative Action.  March 2, 2016.
 Jouvenal, Justin; Lamothe, Dan. "Senior Navy official charged with pointing gun at men during argument". The Washington Post. July 19, 2016.

References

Virginia
Virginia law